Rinn is a municipality in the district of Innsbruck-Land in the Austrian state of Tyrol located 6 km southeast of Innsbruck. The village was mentioned in documents as “Runne” in 1250 for the first time.

Population

Climate
Climate type is dominated by the winter season, a long, cold period with short, clear days, relatively little precipitation mostly in the form of snow, and low humidity.  The Köppen Climate Classification subtype for this climate is "Dfb" (humid continental climate).

References

External links

Cities and towns in Innsbruck-Land District